Acute interstitial pneumonitis is a rare, severe lung disease that usually affects otherwise healthy individuals. There is no known cause or cure.

Acute interstitial pneumonitis is often categorized as both an interstitial lung disease and a form of acute respiratory distress syndrome (ARDS) but it is distinguished from the chronic forms of interstitial pneumonia such as idiopathic pulmonary fibrosis.

Symptoms and signs 
The most common symptoms of acute interstitial pneumonitis are highly productive cough with expectoration of thick mucus, fever, and difficulties breathing. These often occur over a period of one to two weeks before medical attention is sought. The presence of fluid means the person experiences a feeling similar to 'drowning'. Difficulties breathing can quickly progress to an inability to breathe without support (respiratory failure).

Acute interstitial pneumonitis typically progresses rapidly, with hospitalization and mechanical ventilation often required only days to weeks after initial symptoms of cough, fever, and difficulties breathing develop.

Diagnosis 
Rapid progression from initial symptoms to respiratory failure is a key feature. An X-ray that shows ARDS is necessary for diagnosis (fluid in the small air sacs (alveoli) in both lungs). In addition, a biopsy of the lung that shows organizing diffuse alveolar damage is required for diagnosis. This type of alveolar damage can be attributed to nonconcentrated and nonlocalized alveoli damage, marked alveolar septal edema with inflammatory cell infiltration, fibroblast proliferation, occasional hyaline membranes, and thickening of the alveolar walls. The septa are lined with atypical, hyperplastic type II pneumocytes, thus leading to the collapse of airspaces.  Other diagnostic tests are useful in excluding other similar conditions, but history, X-ray, and biopsy are essential. These other tests may include basic blood work, blood cultures, and bronchoalveolar lavage.
The clinical picture is similar to ARDS, but AIP differs from ARDS in that the cause for AIP is not known.

Treatment 
Treatment is primarily supportive. Management in an intensive care unit is required and the need for mechanical ventilation is common. Therapy with corticosteroids is generally attempted, though their usefulness has not been established. The only treatment that has met with success to date is a lung transplant.

Prognosis 
Sixty percent of people with acute interstitial pneumonitis will die in the first six months of illness. The median survival is  months. However, most people who have one episode do not have a second. People who survive often recover lung function completely.

Epidemiology 
Acute interstitial pneumonitis occurs most frequently among people older than forty years old. It affects men and women equally. There are no known risk factors; in particular, smoking is not associated with increased risk.

History 
Acute interstitial pneumonitis was first described in 1935 by Louis Hamman and Arnold Rich, and given the name Hamman–Rich syndrome.

References

External links 

 
 

Respiratory diseases principally affecting the interstitium
Ailments of unknown cause
Syndromes affecting the lung